Tennō (天皇) is a Japanese word for the Emperor of Japan.

Tenno may also refer to:
The Japanese Emperor butterfly Sasakia charonda.
Tenno, Trentino, a municipality in Italy
Tennō, Akita, a town in Japan
Hayden Tenno, the antiheroic protagonist of the 2008 video game Dark Sector
The name given to player-controlled characters as a whole in the video game Warframe

See also
 Tianhuang, Chinese for the characters 天皇